Iraida Fyodorovna Vertiprakhova (23 October 1931 — 28 August 2006) was the first woman to serve as pilot in command of an Il-62 and the only woman awarded the title Honoured Pilot of the USSR.

References 

1931 births
2006 deaths
Soviet women aviators
Recipients of the Order of the Red Banner of Labour